James McHugh is an Irish former Gaelic footballer who played for Cill Chartha and the Donegal county team.

As of 2009, he was working for the ESB.

Playing career
McHugh made his championship debut against Cavan in 1990. He played against Armagh in the 1990 Ulster final, won by Donegal.

A member of Donegal's 1992 All-Ireland Senior Football Championship winning team, he played for the county from 1990 until 1996. He played as a forward and started at left half forward in the 1992 All-Ireland Final, scoring a point from play as Donegal defeated Dublin by a scoreline of 0–18 to 0–14.

He won an All Star in 1992.

He played on for his county until 1996.

With his club Cill Chartha, McHugh won the Championship in 1985, 1989, and 1993.

Family
His brother Martin was also a member of the 1992 All-Ireland winning team. Martin's sons Ryan and Mark and James's son Eoin have also played for Donegal.

See also
 List of All Stars Awards winners (football)

References

External links
 James McHugh at GAAinfo.com
 Slow motion reverse angle of James McHugh beating Dublin goalkeeper John O'Leary in the 1992 All-Ireland Senior Football Championship Final

Year of birth missing (living people)
Living people
Donegal inter-county Gaelic footballers
Gaelic football forwards
James
Kilcar Gaelic footballers
People from Kilcar
Ulster inter-provincial Gaelic footballers
Winners of one All-Ireland medal (Gaelic football)